The Ministry of Culture of Brazil (Portuguese: Ministério da Cultura, MinC) is a cabinet-level federal ministry created in 1985, in the first month of president's José Sarney government, dissolved by Jair Bolsonaro in 2019 and reinstated by Luiz Inácio Lula da Silva in 2023.

Dissolution and reinstatement
In April 1990, it was dissolved by president Fernando Collor de Mello and transformed into a Culture Secretary, directly linked to the presidency. This situation was reverted two years later, but, in the meantime, in 1991, the law called popularly Lei Rouanet was created by the secretary of Culture, Sérgio Paulo Rouanet. It is a law that allows companies and individuals  to sponsor cultural products, up to respectively 4% and 6% of their income tax. It is a law of incentive to the culture, the most important instrument of the ministry, frequently contested.

In 1999, president Fernando Henrique Cardoso expanded the scope of the law, with more financial resources and a reorganization of its structure. Again, in 2003, president Luiz Inácio Lula da Silva restructured the ministry.

The Ministry of Culture was dissolved again on 12 May 2016 by the acting president of Brazil, Michel Temer. Its functions were merged into a new  Ministry of Education and Culture. The dissolution of the ministry immediately sparked protests in numerous Brazilian cities, and included the occupation of the Gustavo Capanema Palace in Rio de Janeiro, and National Foundation of the Arts (FUNARTE) offices in Belo Horizonte, Brasília and São Paulo. Artists such as the singer Otto and Arnaldo Antunes participated in the protests. The Ministry of Culture was reinstated by the Temer government on 23 May 2016, dissolved by Jair Bolsonaro in his first day of presidency and reinstated by the Lula administration in 2023.

See also
Federal institutions of Brazil
List of Ministers of Culture of Brazil

References

External links
 Official website in Portuguese

Brazil
Culture
Brazil, Culture
1985 establishments in Brazil